WGRO (960 AM) is a radio station primarily serving the Lake City, Florida, area, owned by Fred Dockins, through licensee Dockins Broadcast Group, LLC.

960 AM is a regional broadcast frequency.

FM Translator
WGRO simulcasts its programming on an FM translator, which provides improved coverage, better sound and affords listeners the choice of FM.

External links

GRO
1958 establishments in Florida
Radio stations established in 1958
Classic rock radio stations in the United States